Dabhoi is a town and a municipality in the Vadodara district  in the state of Gujarat, India.

History 

Dabhoi was historically known as Darbhavati, Darbikagrama, Darbhavatipura, and Dabhohi. It is first mentioned in the sixth century astronomical treatise Romaka Siddhanta. It was an important pilgrim site for Hindus due to the Kalika temple and for Jains as well. It is also mentioned in several Jain works, such as Hemachandra's Yogartrevritti and Ramchandra's Vikramcharitra.

The town and its surroundings were under Chavda and later under Chaulukya rulers who built few buildings and temples from the ninth century.

The fortification of it is ascribed to the Chaulukya king of Gujarat, Jayasimha Siddharaja (1093-1143 AD), who made this his frontier fortress.  The architectural style and the exquisite stone carving and iconography on the fort walls and gates suggest that it was conceived and constructed in the same period as Rudra Mahalaya and Zinzuwada Fort.  It is mentioned as an important city in the Jain inscriptions of Girnar (VS 1288).

In the 13th century, the town came under Vaghela rule. The information on Dabhoi can be found in prashastis and inscriptions such as Someshwar prashasti, which mentions that the fort surrounding the town was built (1231 CE) during the reign of Vaghela ruler Viradhavala, father of Visaladeva, who made it his frontier fortress. He carried out the construction as a celebration of the birth of his son. The gates of it were said to construct by his ministers Vastupala and Tejapala.

The Vaidyanatha-Mahadeva temple, Parsavanath Jain temple, torana in white marble, Vireshwara temple, and Kumbeshwara complex was also built in the 13th century. Of all these, only gates, Vaidyanatha Mahadeva temple, and Parshwanath Jain temples are in good condition. The ruins of other structures and a kund suggest the grandeur of the town in the 13th and 14th centuries. It came under the Gujarat Sultanate later.

It was a district headquarter during the Mughal rule in Gujarat.

The battle of Dabhoi was fought on 1 April 1731 between Trimbakrao Dabhade and Bajirao Peshwa.

Later it was under the Baroda State.

Fort 
According to the 19th century source, the fort complex covered an area of 800 x 1000 sq. yards. There are four gates in the town, one in each cardinal direction, having indirect entry, located in the middle of each side of the fort wall. These gates are: Hira gate or Hira Bhagol, Baroda or Vadodara gate, Chandod or Nandod gate and Champaner, Mori, Mahudi or Mahmudi gate. Baroda or Vadodara, Chandod, and Champaner gates lead to the cities by those names, whereas the Hira gate was the entrance to the Kalika Temple.

Hira Bhagol is named after the architect, Hiradhar.

The most exquisitely carved gate, is in the east, a.k.a. Hira Darwaza, or " Gate of Diamonds," This Hira Gate, according to tradition, cost more than ten thousand pounds sterling in 1865 values. It is an immense edifice, upwards of a hundred yards long and sixty high, entirely covered with most admirable bas-reliefs of warriors on horseback and in chariots, lions, and elephants.

The Vadodara Gate in the west, Champaner Gate in the north and Nandod Gate in the south.

The fort of Dabhoi is one of the rare surviving examples of Hindu military architecture, based on the shastri traditions described in various Vastu scriptures.

Geography 
It has an average elevation of 99 metres (324 feet).

Demographics 

 the India census, Dabhoi had a population of 54,930.  Males constitute 52% of the population and females 48%. Dabhoi has an average literacy rate of 68%, higher than the national average of 59.5%: male literacy is 75% and, female literacy is 61%. In Dabhoi, 10% of the population is under 6 years of age.

Ecology
The Wadhvana Wetland located here is a wetland that was designated as a Ramsar wetland site on 2021.

Transport 
Dabhoi Junction railway station is the main junction station in Vadodara division of Western Railway.
Pratapnagar (Vadodara)-Dabhoi-Bodeli-Chhota Udaipur has been converted to a broad gauge. The remaining Narrow Gauge lines existing today at Dabhoi are Dabhoi-Miyagam Karjan-Choranda-Moti Koral/Malsar, Dabhoi-Chandod-Kevadiya (Ekta Nagar), Dabhoi-Samlaya Jn.-Timba Road. It has undergone major changes recently. In the latest Railway Budget plan has been made of Gauge Conversion of Dabhoi-Miyagam and Dabhoi-Samalaya Jn. stretch to reduce the freight traffic at Vadodara Jn.

References

External links

 Gaekwads Archaeological Series: The Ruins Of Dabhoi Or Darbhavati In Baroda State

Cities and towns in Vadodara district